In calculus, an antiderivative, inverse derivative, primitive function, primitive integral or indefinite integral of a function  is a differentiable function  whose derivative is equal to the original function . The process of solving for antiderivatives is called antidifferentiation (or indefinite integration), and its opposite operation is called differentiation, which is the process of finding a derivative.

Antiderivatives are related to definite integrals through the second fundamental theorem of calculus: the definite integral of a function over a closed interval where the function is Riemann integrable is equal to the difference between the values of an antiderivative evaluated at the endpoints of the interval.

In physics, antiderivatives arise in the context of rectilinear motion (e.g., in explaining the relationship between position, velocity and acceleration). The discrete equivalent of the notion of antiderivative is antidifference.

Examples
Essentially, the graphs of antiderivatives of a given function are vertical translations of each other, with each graph's vertical location depending upon the value .

More generally, the power function  has antiderivative  if , and  if .

In physics, the integration of acceleration yields velocity plus a constant. The constant is the initial velocity term that would be lost upon taking the derivative of velocity, because the derivative of a constant term is zero. This same pattern applies to further integrations and derivatives of motion (position, velocity, acceleration, and so on). Thus, integration produces the relations of acceleration, velocity and displacement:

Uses and properties
Antiderivatives can be used to compute definite integrals, using the fundamental theorem of calculus: if  is an antiderivative of the integrable function  over the interval , then:

Because of this, each of the infinitely many antiderivatives of a given function  may be called the "indefinite integral" of f and written using the integral symbol with no bounds:

For instance

Varying the lower boundary produces other antiderivatives (but not necessarily all possible antiderivatives). This is another formulation of the fundamental theorem of calculus.

There are many functions whose antiderivatives, even though they exist, cannot be expressed in terms of elementary functions (like polynomials, exponential functions, logarithms, trigonometric functions, inverse trigonometric functions and their combinations). Examples of these are

 the error function 
 the Fresnel function 
 the sine integral 
 the logarithmic integral function  and
 sophomore's dream 

For a more detailed discussion, see also Differential Galois theory.

Techniques of integration
Finding antiderivatives of elementary functions is often considerably harder than finding their derivatives (indeed, there is no pre-defined method for computing indefinite integrals). For some elementary functions, it is impossible to find an antiderivative in terms of other elementary functions. To learn more, see elementary functions and nonelementary integral.

There exist many properties and techniques for finding antiderivatives. These include, among others:

 The linearity of integration (which breaks complicated integrals into simpler ones)
 Integration by substitution, often combined with trigonometric identities or the natural logarithm
 The inverse chain rule method (a special case of integration by substitution)
 Integration by parts (to integrate products of functions)
 The method of partial fractions in integration (which allows us to integrate all rational functions—fractions of two polynomials)
 The Risch algorithm
 Additional techniques for multiple integrations (see for instance double integrals, polar coordinates, the Jacobian and the Stokes' theorem)
 Numerical integration (a technique for approximating a definite integral when no elementary antiderivative exists, as in the case of )
 Algebraic manipulation of integrand (so that other integration techniques, such as integration by substitution, may be used)
Cauchy formula for repeated integration (to calculate the -times antiderivative of a function) 

Computer algebra systems can be used to automate some or all of the work involved in the symbolic techniques above, which is particularly useful when the algebraic manipulations involved are very complex or lengthy. Integrals which have already been derived can be looked up in a table of integrals.

Of non-continuous functions
Non-continuous functions can have antiderivatives. While there are still open questions in this area, it is known that:
 Some highly pathological functions with large sets of discontinuities may nevertheless have antiderivatives.
 In some cases, the antiderivatives of such pathological functions may be found by Riemann integration, while in other cases these functions are not Riemann integrable.

Assuming that the domains of the functions are open intervals:

 A necessary, but not sufficient, condition for a function  to have an antiderivative is that  have the intermediate value property. This is a consequence of Darboux's theorem.
 The set of discontinuities of  must be a meagre set. This set must also be an F-sigma set (since the set of discontinuities of any function must be of this type). Moreover, for any meagre F-sigma set, one can construct some function  having an antiderivative, which has the given set as its set of discontinuities.
 If  has an antiderivative, is bounded on closed finite subintervals of the domain and has a set of discontinuities of Lebesgue measure 0, then an antiderivative may be found by integration in the sense of Lebesgue. In fact, using more powerful integrals like the Henstock–Kurzweil integral, every function for which an antiderivative exists is integrable, and its general integral coincides with its antiderivative.
 If  has an antiderivative  on a closed interval , then for any choice of partition  if one chooses sample points  as specified by the mean value theorem, then the corresponding Riemann sum telescopes to the value .  However if  is unbounded, or if  is bounded but the set of discontinuities of  has positive Lebesgue measure, a different choice of sample points  may give a significantly different value for the Riemann sum, no matter how fine the partition. See Example 4 below.

Some examples

Basic formulae 

 If , then .

See also
 Antiderivative (complex analysis)
 Formal antiderivative
 Jackson integral
 Lists of integrals
 Symbolic integration
 Area

Notes

References

Further reading
 Introduction to Classical Real Analysis, by Karl R. Stromberg; Wadsworth, 1981 (see also)
 Historical Essay On Continuity Of Derivatives by Dave L. Renfro

External links
 Wolfram Integrator — Free online symbolic integration with Mathematica
 Mathematical Assistant on Web — symbolic computations online. Allows users to integrate in small steps (with hints for next step (integration by parts, substitution, partial fractions, application of formulas and others), powered by Maxima
 Function Calculator from WIMS
 Integral at HyperPhysics
 Antiderivatives and indefinite integrals at the Khan Academy
 Integral calculator at Symbolab
 The Antiderivative at MIT
 Introduction to Integrals at SparkNotes
 Antiderivatives at Harvy Mudd College

Integral calculus
Linear operators in calculus